National Police Commission or National Police Commissioner may refer to:
National Police Commission (Philippines), or NAPOLCOM
National Police Commission (South Korea)
National Police Commissioner (Sweden)
Various of the agencies listed in the list of law enforcement agencies